Old Catío is an extinct Chibchan language of Colombia (Adelaar & Muysken, 2004:49).

References

Chibchan languages